Randall H. Patterson (born February 4, 1948) is an American politician. He is a member of the Mississippi House of Representatives from the 115th District, being first elected in 2003. He is a member of the Republican party, after leaving the Democratic party in 2014.

References

1948 births
Living people
Members of the Mississippi House of Representatives
Mississippi Democrats
Mississippi Republicans
21st-century American politicians